Wayne Stenehjem (February 5, 1953 – January 28, 2022) was an American lawyer and politician from the U.S. state of North Dakota. He was the Attorney General of the state, serving from December 15, 2000 until his death. He sought the Republican nomination for governor of North Dakota in 2016 but lost the primary on June 14 by 20%.

Biography
Stenehjem was born in Mohall, North Dakota. He graduated from Bismarck High School in 1971 and Bismarck State College in 1972. He attended the University of North Dakota and the UND School of Law, graduating in 1977. Stenehjem was elected to the North Dakota House of Representatives in 1976, and served two terms there until 1980, when he was elected to the North Dakota Senate. He served in that capacity until 2000, when he became Attorney General of North Dakota.  As Attorney General, Stenehjem proposed legislation to curb methamphetamine use and addiction in the state, by restricting retail sales of certain products used in its manufacture, providing mandatory treatment for first-time drug offenders, and increasing criminal penalties for drug offenders. Stenehjem was reelected in 2004, 2006, 2010, 2014 and 2018 by wide margins. Before his death, he had announced he would not run for reelection in 2022.

He was married to Beth Bakke Stenehjem, and had one son, Andrew. He was the brother of North Dakota Senate Majority Leader Bob Stenehjem (1952–2011) and former North Dakota House of Representatives member Allan Stenehjem (who is now a lobbyist). Stenehjem was hospitalized in Bismarck for an inflamed ulcer on January 28, 2022. He died later that day, at the age of 68.

Career
North Dakota House of Representatives (1976–1980)
North Dakota Senate (1980–2000)
Chairman of the Senate Judiciary Committee (1995–2000)
North Dakota Attorney General (2000–2022)

Controversies 
In 2014, Agent Arnie Rummel, who worked under the North Dakota Bureau of Criminal Investigation, under the supervision of the Attorney General's office, was charged in Dickey County District Court with two misdemeanors. Business owner Darrell Schrum accused Rummel of violating his constitutional rights when the BCI damaged personal property and seized Schrum's payloader and transported it out of state. Rummel had secured a warrant to seize the equipment, suspected as stolen, and Stenehjem's office defended Rummel in the long-running dispute that ensued.

Stenehjem said, "All he did was return a payloader that was stolen to the rightful owner." But Schrum's attorney argued that the trucking company Rummel gave the loader to have no legal ownership and that the search warrant required Rummel only to deliver the loader to the court. Rummel was found in contempt of court and the case resulted in a cash settlement for Schrum, as the payloader was found to have been unlawfully seized.

Electoral history

References

External links
Campaign site

1953 births
2022 deaths
20th-century American politicians
21st-century American politicians
American people of Norwegian descent
Deaths from ulcers
Republican Party members of the North Dakota House of Representatives
North Dakota Attorneys General
Republican Party North Dakota state senators
People from Renville County, North Dakota
University of North Dakota alumni
Candidates in the 2016 United States elections